

Overview
NFTA Metro carried many of its present route numbers and names from the previous International Railway Company routes. Otherwise, much of the routing follows (loosely) the following number schematic:

 1-49 City of Buffalo and Erie County routes
 50-59 City of Niagara Falls and Niagara County routes
 60-81 Express routes to/from Downtown Buffalo
 90-97 Special event routes
 101-118 School bus routes
 200-216 Metrolink routes
The routes recently underwent a major revamping.  Gone are the original "A" designations to "City Line".  Replacing them are destinations to general areas as noted in the listings.

Currently operating routes

(1) Originating Garage-Terminal routes are based at one of three garages: BW=Babcock-William, CS=Cold Springs and Fr=Frontier 
(2) All weekend and holiday service originate out of Frontier

Previously operating routes

References

Niagara Frontier Transportation Authority
Bus Routes of Buffalo and Niagara Falls
Bus transportation in New York (state)